Sky Channel may refer to:

 Sky Channel, a satellite television channel in Europe that broadcast in the 1980s and went on to become Sky One
 Sky Channel (Australia), a national horse racing television network in Australia operated by Tabcorp Holdings
 SKYchannel, a packet switched network for designed by Sky Computers for VME-based high performance computers.

See also 
 Sky News Channel
 Sky News Business Channel
 Sky News Weather Channel
 Sky Racing Channel
 Sky Radio